Walk on the Wild Side is a 2009 British comedy sketch show shown on BBC One. It involves the overdubbing of voiceovers to natural history footage, to give the appearance of the animals doing the talking. Celebrity guest voices are also included in each episode, with the exception of the pilot episode.

A second series began airing on BBC One from 18 September 2010.

Cast and writers

Manford, Edge, Richardson, Webster, and Suttie all write the series as well as providing voiceovers. Alex Horne, Alistair Griggs and Ian Manford write the series with them.

Episodes

Series One (2009)

Series Two (2010)

Music
The show often uses music for comic effect, and it has used a range of contemporary music as well as popular music from the past. Artists featured include: Toto, Lady Gaga, Beyoncé, Marvin Gaye, The Pussycat Dolls, Barry White, Shaggy, Lulu, Stevie Wonder, Robbie Williams, Tinie Tempah, Bon Jovi, Radiohead and Adam and The Ants.

See also
, a French TV show created in 1990 by Patrick Bouchitey.
 When Nature Calls with Helen Mirren, a 2021 American adaptation of the series

References

External links 

BBC television sketch shows
2000s British television sketch shows
2010s British television sketch shows
2009 British television series debuts
2010 British television series endings
Television series about mammals